Eratasthelys corona is a species of extremely small deep water sea snail, a marine gastropod mollusk in the family Seguenziidae.

Description
The length of the shell attains 6.7 mm.

Distribution
This marine species occurs off New Caledonia
.

References

External links
 To Encyclopedia of Life
 To World Register of Marine Species

Eratasthelys
Gastropods described in 1991